Deptford is an area in the London Borough of Lewisham and London Borough of Greenwich.

Deptford also may refer to:

Geography 
 Relating to the area of London
 Deptford (UK Parliament constituency) (1885–1974)
 Lewisham Deptford (UK Parliament constituency) (since 2015)
 Deptford St Nicholas, former parish
 Deptford St Paul, former parish
 Metropolitan Borough of Deptford (1900–1965)
 Deptford railway station
 Deptford Bridge DLR station
 Deptford Dockyard, former naval dockyard
 Deptford Wharf
 Deptford Market
 Deptford Green School
 Deptford Park

 Elsewhere in the United Kingdom
 Deptford, Sunderland, a location
 Deptford, Wiltshire, a hamlet

 New Jersey, United States
 Deptford Township
 West Deptford Township
 Deptford Township High School
 West Deptford High School
 Deptford Mall

People 
 Sir Richard Browne, 1st Baronet, of Deptford

Media 
 "The Adventure of the Deptford Horror", by Adrian Conan Doyle
 A Dead Man in Deptford, by Anthony Burgess
 The Deptford Mice cycle, by Robin Jarvis
 Deptford Fun City Records, defunct record sub-label
 The Deptford Trilogy, novels by Robertson Davies set in the fictional village of Deptford, Ontario

Other uses 
 , nine ships of the Royal Navy
 Deptford culture, Native American archaeological culture (2500–100 BCE) of southeast United States
 Deptford Pink, flowering plant Dianthus armeria
 Battle of Deptford Bridge, 1497

See also 
 Deptford Bridge (disambiguation)